Cahuilla County was a proposed county initiated by the residents of eastern Riverside County, California in the 1980s. It was named after the Cahuilla people, being the homeland of the Native American Tribe for over 2,000 years.

The proposed county would have included the Coachella Valley including the cities of:
 Palm Springs
 Desert Hot Springs
 Cathedral City
 Rancho Mirage
 Palm Desert
 Indian Wells
 La Quinta
 Indio
 Coachella
 Blythe

The ballot measure was ultimately defeated.

Boundaries

The eastern border of the county would have included the current Riverside County's existing eastern county-line north and south of Blythe along the Colorado River and Arizona border. The western border of the county (either the city limits of Banning/Beaumont or near Cabazon) would have included the mountain community of Idyllwild in the San Jacinto Mountains, east of the Hemet area which would have remained in Riverside County.

Proponents argued at the time that the eastern Colorado Desert and Peninsular Ranges mountain areas were distinct from the western urban basin area, commonly known as the Inland Empire, and they were too far removed from the county seat at Riverside, about 70 miles from the possible Cahuilla county seat of Indio.

See also
 Colorado Desert

References

Proposed counties of the United States
History of Riverside County, California
Coachella Valley
Colorado Desert
Blythe, California
Indio, California
Palm Desert, California
Palm Springs, California